Coyhaique Alto is a Chilean frontier complex located in Aysen Region.

Climate 

The climate is subpolar oceanic (Csc), with very cool summers and cold winters.
In June 2002, it registered -37C, the coldest official temperature of South America

References

 Coyhaique Alto
 Dirección Meteorológica de Chile: Climatología

Aysén Region